List of some hospitals and medical centers in the city of Port Harcourt, Nigeria.

 Acron Medical Consultants // 1 Acron Drive, Behind Plot 28 Stadium Rd, GRA Phase IV, Port Harcourt

|| Shield Specialists Hospital// The Pain Care Center.
{Specialists in Pain Management, Painless Labor and Delivery.
Intensive Care,
Surgical Interventions}
 Call 08033122337 

Plot 4 Close D, Peace Valley Estate, Trans Woji Road, Port Harcourt. Nigeria.

References

Bethesda Mission Hospital

External links

Hospitals
Port Harcourt
Port Harcourt